Kusuma  is a village attached to 'MAGARIWARA' in Reodar Tahsil of Sirohi District of Indian state of Rajasthan. It is 45 km from Abu Road. Its ancient name was Kutsasrama meaning a hermitage of Kutsa. In the seventh century it was famous for the temple of Shiva, built in neighbourhood of Kusuma by a warrior named Satyabhata. In 625 AD this area was held by Rajilla who was a feudatory of King Varmalata of Bhinmal.

Villages in Sirohi district
Tourist attractions in Sirohi district